Otto Erdmann may refer to:
 Otto Erdmann (painter), German painter
 Otto Erdmann (art director), German art director
 Otto Linné Erdmann, German chemist